St. Aloysius Industrial Training Institute (SAITI) in Mangalore, Karnataka, India, was established by the Society of Jesus in 1981.

See also
 List of Jesuit sites

References  

Colleges of Mangalore University
Jesuit universities and colleges in India
Universities and colleges in Mangalore
Educational institutions established in 1981